There were 4 female and 22 male athletes representing the country at the 2000 Summer Paralympics.

Medallists

See also
Kuwait at the 2000 Summer Olympics
Kuwait at the Paralympics

References

Bibliography

External links
International Paralympic Committee

Nations at the 2000 Summer Paralympics
Paralympics
2000